Mendax trizonalis is a species of minute sea snail, a marine gastropod mollusc in the family Cerithiopsidae.

Subspecies
 Mendax trizonalis odhneri (Powell, 1927)
 Mendax trizonalis trizonalis (Odhner, 1924) represented as Mendax trizonalis (Odhner, 1924) (alternate representation

References

 Spencer, H.G., Marshall, B.A. & Willan, R.C. (2009). Checklist of New Zealand living Mollusca. pp 196–219 in Gordon, D.P. (ed.) New Zealand inventory of biodiversity. Volume one. Kingdom Animalia: Radiata, Lophotrochozoa, Deuterostomia. Canterbury University Press, Christchurch.

Further reading
 Powell A. W. B., New Zealand Mollusca, William Collins Publishers Ltd, Auckland, New Zealand 1979 

Cerithiopsidae
Gastropods of New Zealand
Gastropods described in 1924